Cochas District may refer to:
Cochas District, Concepción
Cochas District, Ocros
Cochas District, Yauyos

District name disambiguation pages